Zane Waddell (born 18 March 1998) is a South African swimmer. He competed in the men's 100 metre freestyle event at the 2017 World Aquatics Championships. Waddell won Gold in the 50 metres backstroke event at the 2019 World Aquatics Championships.

References

External links
 

1998 births
Living people
South African male swimmers
Male backstroke swimmers
South African male freestyle swimmers
World Aquatics Championships medalists in swimming
Sportspeople from Bloemfontein
White South African people
Universiade medalists in swimming
Universiade gold medalists for South Africa
Medalists at the 2019 Summer Universiade
Alabama Crimson Tide men's swimmers
20th-century South African people
21st-century South African people